Péter Kristály (born 15 October 1967) is a Hungarian alpine skier. He competed in five events at the 1992 Winter Olympics.

References

1967 births
Living people
Hungarian male alpine skiers
Olympic alpine skiers of Hungary
Alpine skiers at the 1992 Winter Olympics
Sportspeople from Miercurea Ciuc